Clemens Meyer (born 1977) is a German writer. He is the author of Als wir träumten (As We Were Dreaming, 2006), Die Nacht, die Lichter (All the Lights, 2008), Gewalten (Acts of Violence, 2010), Im Stein (Bricks and Mortar, 2013), and Die stillen Trabanten (Dark Satellites, 2017). Of Meyer's works, All the Lights, Bricks and Mortar, and Dark Satellites have been translated into English.

Early life 

Meyer was born on 20 August 1977 in Halle an der Saale. His studies at the German Literature Institute, Leipzig, were interrupted by a spell in a youth detention centre. He worked as a security guard, forklift driver and construction worker before he became a published novelist.

Work 

Meyer won a number of prizes for his first novel Als wir träumten (As We Were Dreaming), published in 2006, in which a group of friends grow up and go off the rails in East Germany after the fall of the Berlin Wall. He received the Rheingau Literatur Preis in 2006. It has been adapted into a film As We Were Dreaming, released in 2015.

His second book, Die Nacht, die Lichter (All the Lights, 2008), was translated by Katy Derbyshire and published by independent London publisher And Other Stories in 2011. It won the Leipzig Book Fair Prize in 2008. His third book, Gewalten (Acts of Violence), is a diary of 2009 in eleven stories.

His 2013 novel Im Stein (Bricks and Mortar) was translated by Katy Derbyshire and included in the long list for the International Man Booker Prize. The novel won the prestigious Bremer Literaturpreis in 2014, and was shortlisted for the Deutsche Buchpreis in 2013. The English translation won the "Straelener Übersetzerpreis" of the Kunststiftung NRW in 2018 and was shortlisted for the 2019 Best Translated Book Award.

Awards 
Winner of the Leipzig Book Fair Prize 2008
Winner of the German Screenplay Award 2015 for In the Aisles

Bibliography 

Novels
 Als wir träumten (As We Were Dreaming, 2006)
 Im Stein (2013). trans. Katy Derbyshire, Bricks and Mortar, London: Fizcarraldo Editions, 2016

Short stories and collected writings
Die Nacht, die Lichter (2008). trans. Katy Derbyshire, All the Lights, London: And Other Stories, 2011. 
Gewalten (Acts of Violence, 2010)
Der Untergang der Äkschn GmbH: Frankfurter Poetikvorlesungen (The Downfall of Action Ltd.: Frankfurt poetics lectures, 2016)
Die stillen Trabanten (2017). trans. Katy Derbyshire, Dark Satellites, London: Fitzcarraldo Editions, 2020.

Other publications
Zwei Himmelhunde: Irre Filme, die man besser liest (Movies that you better read, with Claudius Nießen, 2016)

Filmography 
Screenplays
Herbert (directed and co-written by Thomas Stuber, 2015)
Der Dicke liebt (short film, directed and co-written by Alexander Khuon, 2016)
In the Aisles (directed and co-written by Thomas Stuber, 2018)
Tatort: Angriff auf Wache 08 (TV film, directed and co-written by Thomas Stuber, 2019)

Acting roles
Als wir träumten (2015)
Herbert (2015)
In the Aisles (2018)
Tatort: Angriff auf Wache 08 (2019)

References

External links 
 

1977 births
Living people
Writers from Halle (Saale)
German male writers